David Webb Peoples (born February 9, 1940) is an American screenwriter who wrote Blade Runner (1982), Unforgiven (1992), and 12 Monkeys (1995). He was nominated for Oscar, Golden Globe, and BAFTA awards. He won the best screenplay awards from the L.A. Film Critics (1991) and National Society of Film Critics (1992) for Unforgiven.

Early life
Peoples was born in Middletown, Connecticut, the son of Ruth Clara (née Levinger) and Joe Webb Peoples, a geologist. He studied English at the University of California, Berkeley.

Career

Peoples worked as a film editor in the 1970s while writing screenplays, but his writing career took off after he was hired as co-writer on Blade Runner after director Ridley Scott and screenwriter Hampton Fancher parted ways. Following the success of Blade Runner, Peoples worked on Ladyhawke (1985) and Leviathan (1989).

During the 1980s, Peoples wrote a script based on DC Comics' Sgt. Rock series. Arnold Schwarzenegger was picked to play the title role; the project was revived three decades later in 2010 involving Joel Silver and Easy Company, although with the expectation to set the narrative in a place other than the battlefields of World War II to distinguish the project from the earlier script.

Other Peoples' screenplays were purchased during the 1980s, many after studio development prior to production: Unforgiven, Soldier, and The Blood of Heroes. The Blood of Heroes was directed by Peoples, and starred Rutger Hauer. Peoples received his greatest recognition for Unforgiven (1992). He wrote the script in 1976, titled The William Munny Killings and appearing in theaters in 1992. Peoples' screwball comedy Hero also appeared in 1992.

Later in 1992, Peoples worked with his wife Janet Peoples on 12 Monkeys (1995), a science fiction fable about time travel inspired by Chris Marker's experimental short film La Jetée.

In 1998, Soldier was filmed by British director Paul W. S. Anderson, although it was re-written by Anderson.

Filmography

As of February 2015, Peoples has thirteen writing credits (ten for original screenplays, two for stories, and one for source material), as well as five credits for editing, and three credits for directing. 

The Day After Trinity (1980) (writer, with Janet Peoples, Jon Else; editor)
Blade Runner (with Hampton Fancher) (1982)
Ladyhawke (with Tom Mankiewicz, Michael Thomas and Edward Khmara) (1985)
Leviathan (with Jeb Stuart) (1989)
The Blood of Heroes (aka Salute of the Jugger) (1989; also directed)
Fatal Sky (1990) (as "Anthony Able") 
Unforgiven (1992)
Hero (1992)
12 Monkeys (with Janet Peoples) (1995)
Soldier (1998)

Awards
Peoples' highest accolades are for Unforgiven. It received Oscar, Golden Globe and British Academy nominations, and won L.A. Film Critics (1991) and National Society of Film Critics (1992) awards for best screenplay. Peoples was presented with the Distinguished Screenwriter Award at the 2010 Austin Film Festival.

Further reading

References

External links

Cinequest Film Festival - Interview with Janet and David Webb Peoples

1940 births
Living people
People from Middletown, Connecticut
American science fiction writers
American male screenwriters
Hugo Award-winning writers
UC Berkeley College of Letters and Science alumni
American male novelists
Screenwriters from Connecticut
American film editors